is a Japanese voice actor from Tokyo, Japan.

Notable Roles

Anime

2005

 Kaiketsu Zorori (Hawke)

2006

 Nana (Staff)
 Pocket Monsters: Diamond & Pearl (Roark)
 Ghost Slayers Ayashi (Young Samurai)

2007

 REIDEEN (Junki Saiga)
 Mobile Suit Gundam 00 (Lichtendahl Tsery)

2008

 Macross Frontier (Clerk)
 Allison & Lillia (Villagers, Audience)
 To Love-Ru (Catcher, Tsure)
 CLANNAD: After Story (Student)
 Linebarrels of Iron (Student, High School Students)

2009

 Jewelpet (Naoto)
 Juden Chan (Man)

Movie

2007

 Nezumi Monogatari - George to Gerald no Bōken (Nezumi)

2010

 Mobile Suit Gundam 00 the Movie: A Wakening of the Trailblazer (Lichtendahl Tsery)

External links
 

Year of birth missing (living people)
Living people
Japanese male voice actors
People from Tokyo